Badminton tournament at the 2018 Asian Para Games was held at Istora Gelora Bung Karno, Jakarta, Indonesia from 6 to 13 October. The badminton programme in 2018 included men's and women's singles competitions; men's, women's and mixed doubles competitions alongside men's team events.

Classification

The players were classified to six different classes as per determined by Badminton World Federation.

Medal table

Medalists
Below are the medalists:

Men

Women

Mixed

Men's team standing (SL3-SU5) results

See also 
 Badminton at the 2018 Asian Games

References
 https://bwfpara.tournamentsoftware.com/tournament/62cf57e0-e40b-42d8-b04b-4a4891183aa5/matches/

2018 Asian Para Games events
Badminton at the Asian Para Games
Asian Para Games